Andriy Ivanovych Riznyk (born 15 March 2000) is a Ukrainian professional footballer who plays as a centre-forward for Ukrainian club Nyva Ternopil.

References

External links
 

2000 births
Living people
People from Ternopil Oblast
Ukrainian footballers
Association football forwards
FC Ternopil players
FC Krystal Chortkiv players
FC Nyva Ternopil players
Ukrainian First League players
Ukrainian Second League players